Antonio J. Granadillo (born August 10, 1984 at Valencia, Carabobo, Venezuela) is a former professional baseball infielder.

Professional career
Granadillo was signed by the St. Louis Cardinals on May 1, 2001 as an undrafted free agent. He started his professional career in 2004 playing for the Johnson City Cardinals of the Appalachian League. He was selected Appalachian League All-Star 3B during the year.

In December  he was acquired by the Red Sox in the Rule 5 draft in the minor league phase. In 2005 and 2006, he spent time with the Gulf Coast Red Sox and Greenville Bombers. In 2007, he played for the Lancaster JetHawks.

In 2008, Granadillo was invited to participate in the Red Sox spring training major league camp. He was reassigned to minor league camp on March 8. He spent the season mostly with the Portland Sea Dogs, and became a free agent at the end of the season. He was not picked up as a free agent, which ended his stateside professional career. Granadillo participated in the 2011 Baseball World Cup for Venezuela.

Awards and recognition
2004 Appalachian League All-Star
2007 California League All-Star

References

External links

Sox Prospects Tony Granadillo page

1984 births
Living people
Sportspeople from Valencia, Venezuela
Venezuelan baseball players
Portland Sea Dogs players